Premier-Maître L'Her (F792) is a  in the French Navy.

Design 

The aviso has a crew of 90 sailors, and vessels of this class have the reputation of being among the most difficult in bad weather. Their high windage makes them particularly sensitive to pitch and roll as soon as the sea is formed.

Their armament, consequent for a vessel of this tonnage, allows them to manage a large spectrum of missions. During the Cold War, they were primarily used to patrol the continental shelf of the Atlantic Ocean in search of Soviet Navy submarines. Due to the poor performance of the hull sonar, as soon as an echo appeared, the reinforcement of an ASM frigate was necessary to chase it using its towed variable depth sonar.

Their role as patrollers now consists mainly of patrols and assistance missions, as well as participation in UN missions (blockades, flag checks) or similar marine policing tasks (fight against drugs, extraction of nationals, fisheries control, etc.). The mer-mer 38 or mer-mer 40 missiles have been landed, but they carry several machine guns and machine guns, more suited to their new missions.

Its construction cost was estimated at 270,000,000 French francs.

Construction and career 
Premier-Maître L'Her was laid down on 15 December 1978 at Arsenal de Lorient, Lorient. Launched on 28 June 1980 and commissioned on 15 December 1981.

On 1 January 2009, the ship which participated in the European anti-piracy mission Operation Atalanta east of the Gulf of Aden, responded twice to distress calls from a cargo ship under the flag of Panama. After the freighter's second distress call, the pirates having fled shortly before during the first. The aviso spotted and then stopped the two pirate boats on board which were eight Somalis, armed with six AK-47 assault rifles and a RPG-7 rocket launcher. The suspected pirates were then held aboard the ship en route to the Somali coast to hand them over to the authorities of this country.

In February 2013, the ship participated in Operation Serval for one month. 

From 21 October to 20 December 2017, the vessel was engaged in the EU Navfor Med Sophia mission during which it participated in the rescue of two boats in difficulty. The ship was notably in the area during the events of 6 November 2017.

From 29 March to 15 April 2019, the ship participated in the NATO military exercise Exercise Joint Warrior. Despite the vessel's weak means of detection, the ship was appointed lead of the anti-submarine warfare force. In December 2022, the Navy Mini Drone System (SMDM) was installed on the ship to enhance its surveillance capabilities. The drone was described as being able to film and photograph and track, in real time, targets up to  distant from the ship.

In January 2023 Premier-Maître L'Her arrived for a three-month deployment in the Gulf of Guinea for counter-illegal fishing and counter-smuggling operations.

Premier-Maître L'Her is scheduled to be withdrawn from service in 2024 and be replaced by one of a new class of ocean-going patrol vessels (the Patrouilleurs Océanique).

Citations 

Ships built in Lorient
1980 ships
D'Estienne d'Orves-class avisos